aka  is a 2001 Japanese Pink film directed by Toshiki Satō. It was chosen as Best Film of the year at the Pink Grand Prix ceremony. Shinji Imaoka was awarded Best Screenplay and actress Mao Nakagawa was chosen Best New Actress for their work on this film.

Cast
 Mao Nakagawa
 Tsukasa Saitō
 Yumeka Sasaki
 Yūji Tajiri
 Takeshi Itō

Availability
The film was released on DVD in Japan under its theatrical title on October 25, 2002. Besides an individual release, the DVD was included in a 3-disc Toshiki Satō collection. The Film was released on DVD in the UK under Salvation's Sacrament DVD label on 28 May 2004.

Bibliography

References

2001 films
2000s erotic films
Films directed by Toshiki Satō
2000s Japanese-language films
MILF pornography
Pink films
Shintōhō Eiga films
2000s pornographic films
2000s Japanese films